Sonia is a Bangladeshi actress and model. She acted in more than 50 Bangladeshi films.

Biography
Sonia learned dancing from Bulbul Lalitakala Academy. Before coming to Dhallywood her dance performances were telecasted on many programs of Bangladesh Television.

Sonia made her debut on Dhallywood with Mastan Raja in 1991. But, in Prem Shakti she made her debut as a heroine where her co-star was Bapparaj. In 1995 she acted in Shopner Thikana where her co-star was Salman Shah. Her last released film was Shoshurbari Jindabad.

Sonia also acted in television dramas. Besides, she became model on the advertisements of Middle Soap and Citizen Television. She is now living in London.

Selected filmography
 Byathar Daan (1989) - Young Panna
 Mastan Raja (1991)
 Prem Shakti (1993)
 Voyongkor Saat Din (1993)
 Kaliya (1994) - Minu
 Ghatok (1994) - Bishakha
 Swapner Thikana (1995) - Farha
 Banglar Nayok (1995) - Julie
 Ojante (1996) - Tithi
 Prem Protishodh
 Shoto Jonomer Prem
 Aaj Gaye Holud (2000) - Shila Majumder
 Tochnoch
 Ora Desher Sontan
 Poran Kokila
 Loveletter
 Shoshurbari Zindabad (2002) - Riya Chowdhury 
 Juari (2002)
 Shahoshi Manush Chai (2003) - Tuski
 Bou Shashurir Juddho (2003) - Rubi Chowdhury
 Zero Zero Seven (007) (2004)

Selected television dramas
 Porshi
 Beder Meye
 Nana Rokom Manush
 Khan Bahadurer Tin Chhele
 Pranto Rekhay
 Babree Namer Meyeti
 Dhusor Prohor

References

Living people
Bangladeshi film actresses
Bangladeshi female models
Bangladeshi television actresses
Year of birth missing (living people)